is a railway station in the town of Mamurogawa, Yamagata, Japan, operated by the East Japan Railway Company (JR East).

Lines
Kamabuchi Station is served by the Ōu Main Line, and is located 173.2 rail kilometers from the terminus of the line at Fukushima Station.

Station layout
The station has a two opposed side platforms, connected by a footbridge. The station is unattended.

Platforms

History
Kamabuchi Station opened on October 21, 1904. The station was absorbed into the JR East network upon the privatization of JNR on April 1, 1987.

Surrounding area
 Kamabuchi Post Office
 Mamurogawa River

See also
List of railway stations in Japan

References

External links

 JR East Station information 

Stations of East Japan Railway Company
Railway stations in Yamagata Prefecture
Ōu Main Line
Railway stations in Japan opened in 1904
Mamurogawa, Yamagata